The 2017 AFL Women's season was the inaugural season of the AFL Women's competition, the new highest level senior Australian rules football competition in Australia. The season featured eight clubs, ran from 3 February until 25 March, and comprised a 7-game home-and-away season followed by a grand final featuring the top two clubs.

Premiership season

Home-and-away matches 

The full fixture was released on Friday 9 December 2016. Notable features of the draw include:
 and  featured in the league's first ever match, the match was initially scheduled to be held at Collingwood's home Olympic Park Oval, but was moved in January 2017 to the higher capacity Ikon Park due to higher than expected interest.
, Carlton,  and the  each had four home games, while all other clubs had three.
Adelaide,  and Fremantle each hosted matches at grounds outside of their home metropolitan area with trips to Darwin, Canberra and Mandurah respectively. Fremantle played their home game against Carlton at Domain Stadium, the home ground of the men's team, as part of a double-header which also included an AFL pre-season match between the same two clubs.
The Western Bulldogs featured in the most free-to-air televised matches (four), Collingwood and  had three each, Adelaide had two and all other clubs had only one.
Many games were played in the late morning and late afternoon to avoid the summer heat, especially in Brisbane and Western Australia.
All starting times are local.

Round 1

Round 2

Round 3

Round 4

Round 5

Round 6

Round 7

Win/Loss table 

Bold – Home game
X – Bye
Opponent for round listed above margin
This table can be sorted by margin, winners are represented in the first half of each column, and losers are represented in the second half of each column once sorted

Ladder

Ladder progression 
Numbers highlighted in green indicates the team finished the round inside the top 2.
Numbers highlighted in blue indicates the team finished in first place on the ladder in that round.	
Numbers highlighted in red indicates the team finished in last place on the ladder in that round.

Grand final 

In the absence of a finals series, the two teams who finished the highest on the ladder at the end of the home and away season played in the AFL Women's Grand Final.  finished as the minor premiers and secured a spot in the grand final at the end of round six; 's round seven win over  saw them secure the second spot in the grand final over  due to a higher percentage. It was confirmed in February by AFL Chief Executive Officer, Gillon McLachlan, that the team finishing highest on the ladder at the end of the season would earn the right to host the grand final in their home state. The match was originally planned to be held at the Gabba, however due to its ground surface being in a dangerous state, the grand final was moved to Metricon Stadium on the Gold Coast as a curtain raiser to the  versus  AFL match.

Attendances

By club

By ground

Coach changes

Club leadership

Honours

Awards 
The Rising Star was awarded to Ebony Marinoff of Adelaide.
The best on ground in the AFLW Grand Final was awarded to Erin Phillips of Adelaide.
The goal of the year was awarded to Erin Phillips of Adelaide.
The mark of the year was awarded to Darcy Vescio of Carlton.
AFLW Players Association awards
The most valuable player was awarded to Erin Phillips of Adelaide.
The most courageous player was awarded to Chelsea Randall of Adelaide.

Best and fairest

AFLW leading goalkicker 
Numbers highlighted in blue indicates the player led the season's goal kicking tally at the end of that round.

All-Australian team 

The final All-Australian team was announced on 28 March. Grand finalists  and  had the most representatives with five each, and every team had at least one representative.  captain Daisy Pearce was announced as the All-Australian captain and Adelaide co-captain Erin Phillips was announced as the vice-captain.

State of Origin 

In mid-July the AFL announced a State of Origin representative match would be held for AFL Women's players during the AFL season pre-finals bye. A team of players born in Victoria would play a single exhibition match against a team of players from the rest of Australia at Etihad Stadium on the evening of Saturday 2 September. Initial squads for the match were announced on 25 July including that  AFLW football operations manager Debbie Lee would coach Victoria, while  premiership coach Bec Goddard, would coach the Allies.

Squads

Result

See also
2016 AFL Women's draft

References

External links

 Official AFL Women's website

 
AFL Women's seasons
2017 in Australian rules football